This is a list of BDSM equipment:

Restraints 

 Armbinder, Monoglove
 Anal hook
 Ball lock
 Bondage cuffs
 Bondage mittens
 Bondage harness
 Bondage belt
 Bondage hood
 Bondage tape
 Bondage yoke - a yoke for BDSM play
 Chain
 Chastity device
 Cock ring
 Cohesive bandage
 Collar
 Corset
 Diapers
 Elbow harness

 Head harness
 Hobble skirt
 Human pony harness
 Humbler
 Medical restraints
 Mouth gag: Funnel gag, Dental gag, Ring gag, Mouthguard gag, Inflatable gag, Bit gag, Ball gag, Muzzle gag, Penis gag
 Nose hook
 Padlock
Penis plug
 Plastic wrap
 Posture collar
 Pussy hook
 Rope
 Shackles
 Sleepsacks
 Speculum 
 Spreader bar
 Stocks
 Straitjackets

Bondage furniture 

 A-frame
 Ankle/wrist stocks
 Berkley Horse
 Bondage bed
 Bondage bench
 Bondage chair
 Bondage frame
 Bondage stool
 Bondage table
 Bondage wheel
 Box stocks
Fisting slings and swings
 Genital stocks
 Grope box
 Gynaecological chair
 Gynaecological table
 Hoist
 Inversion table
 Massage tables
 Queening stool
 Rack
 Sawhorse
 Seated cross
 Smotherbox
 Spanking horse
 Stocks and pillories
 Whipping bench
 Wooden horse
 X-cross

Sensory deprivation 
See also:Sensory deprivation

 Blindfolds
 Bondage hoods
 Gas masks
 Sleepsacks
 Vacuum beds

Physical stimulation 

 Breast press
 Butt plugs
 Cane (synthetic fiber or natural fiber)
 Enema equipment
 Floggers
 Nipple clamps
 Riding crop
 Spanking paddles
 Spanking belt
 Titty twister
Urethral sound
 Vampire gloves
 Wartenberg Wheel
 Whip

Sexual stimulation 
 Erotic electrostimulation apparatus
 Masturbation machine
 Strap-on dildo
 Sybian
 Vibrator
 Violet wand
 Sex machine

See also 
 Bondage positions and methods
 Erotic furniture
 Outline of BDSM
 Sex toy

References

Bondage